Saraçlar can refer to:

 Saraçlar, Çine
 Saraçlar, Kargı